Reza Vatankhah (born February 9, 1947 in Tehran, Iran) is an Iranian retired football player. He played for Persepolis F.C. as a left winger, and is now a manager. His elder brother Büyük was also a member and captain of Persepolis F.C.

Vatankhah managed the Iran national football team during 1989.

References

External links

1947 births
Living people
Iranian footballers
Iran international footballers
Persepolis F.C. players
People from Tehran
Footballers at the 1970 Asian Games
Tractor S.C. managers
Association football wingers
Asian Games competitors for Iran
Iranian football managers
Shahin Bushehr F.C. managers